The men's 100 metre freestyle event at the 1956 Olympic Games took place between 29 and 30 November. There were 34 competitors from 19 nations. Nations had been limited to three swimmers each since the 1924 Games. The event was won by Jon Henricks of Australia, the nation's first medal in the event. Australia would win a second 0.4 seconds later (John Devitt's silver) and a third 0.9 seconds after that (Gary Chapman's bronze), sweeping the podium—the first sweep in the men's 100 metre freestyle since the United States did it in 1920 and 1924, and the first sweep of any event by Australian competitors. This year, the Americans finished fourth through sixth. It was the first time since 1924 that Japan had competed (that is, excluding 1948) but not medaled.

Background

This was the 12th appearance of the men's 100 metre freestyle. The event has been held at every Summer Olympics except 1900 (when the shortest freestyle was the 200 metres), though the 1904 version was measured in yards rather than metres.

Two of the eight finalists from the 1952 Games returned: silver medalist Hiroshi Suzuki of Japan and seventh-place finisher Aldo Eminente of France. The favorite in 1956 was Jon Henricks of Australia, a converted distance swimmer who had begun racing sprints in 1953.

Colombia and Indonesia each made their debut in the event; East and West Germany competed together as the United Team of Germany for the first time. The United States made its 12th appearance, having competed at each edition of the event to date.

Competition format

The competition used a three-round (heats, semifinals, final) format. The advancement rule followed the format introduced in 1952 (though with only 2 semifinals instead of 3). A swimmer's place in the heat was not used to determine advancement; instead, the fastest times from across all heats in a round were used. There were 5 heats of 6 or 7 swimmers each. The top 16 swimmers advanced to the semifinals. There were 2 semifinals of 8 swimmers each. The top 8 swimmers advanced to the final. Swim-offs were used as necessary to break ties.

This swimming event used freestyle swimming, which means that the method of the stroke is not regulated (unlike backstroke, breaststroke, and butterfly events). Nearly all swimmers use the front crawl or a variant of that stroke. Because an Olympic size swimming pool is 50 metres long, this race consisted of two lengths of the pool.

Records

These were the standing world and Olympic records (in seconds) prior to the 1956 Summer Olympics.

Reid Patterson broke the Olympic record in the fourth heat with a time of 56.8 seconds; in the same heat, Atsushi Tani tied the old record. In the first semifinal, Jon Henricks broke Patterson's new record with a 55.7 second time. Dick Hanley came in under the old record time; in the second semifinal, Patterson matched the pre-1956 record, Gary Chapman, beat the pre-1956 record, and John Devitt beat Patterson's mark from the heats. Henrick's final time of 55.4 was another new Olympic record as well as the world competitive (non-time trial) record.

Schedule

Results

Heats

Five heats were held; the fastest sixteen swimmers advanced to the semifinal round.

Semifinals

Two heats were held; the swimmers with the fastest eight times advanced to the final.

Final

References

 Official Report, pp. 593–94.

Men's freestyle 100 metre
Men's events at the 1956 Summer Olympics